MacKillop Catholic College is an independent Roman Catholic co-educational secondary school for Years 7 to 10 in the Hobart suburb of Mornington, Tasmania, Australia. The school is named in honour of the Australian educationalist Mary MacKillop, an Australian nun who has been declared a saint by the Catholic Church. The school also has an association with the Christian Brothers founded by Edmund Rice. MacKillop and Rice are key sources of inspiration for the school community. MacKillop Catholic College is the only Catholic secondary college servicing Hobart's eastern shore.

The college is a member of the Sports Association of Tasmanian Independent Schools.

History
MacKillop Catholic College was part of a restructuring of Catholic education in the Archdiocese of Hobart during the early 1990s, although moves to establish a Catholic secondary school on the eastern shore of Hobart had begun in the 1960s. During 1993 the Catholic Church purchased the site and buildings of Mornington Primary School, which had ceased operation as a state primary school at the end of 1992. MacKillop was opened on the site on 9 February 1994, with 59 students. By 2009 the enrolment had grown to more than 500 students. Over the first 10 years of the school's operation a staged building program was implemented, with the eighth stage completed in 2004.

Houses
The school is named in honour of the Australian educationalist Mary MacKillop, and the works of MacKillop are the theme of the school houses: Waterford, Rice, Penola, Sion, Tenison, and Fitzroy . MacKillop colleges house teams are named after significant locations or people.

Notable past students
Hugh Greenwood - AFL Footballer
Josh Green (footballer) - AFL Footballer
Sam Rainbird - Cricketer
Lachlan Marsh - Director of Ministry
Jarrod Westell - __

See also

 List of schools in Tasmania
 Education in Tasmania

References

External links
 St Aloyius Catholic College website
 Tasmanian Catholic Education Office website

Catholic secondary schools in Hobart
Educational institutions established in 1994
1994 establishments in Australia